Eucalyptus conglobata, also known as the cong mallee or Port Lincoln mallee, is a species of eucalypt that is native to the south coast of Western Australia and South Australia. It is a mallee with smooth bark, lance-shaped adult leaves, flower buds in groups of seven, white flowers and clustered hemispherical fruit.

Description
It has smooth grey to brown-tan over creamy grey bark. Flowering occurs from November to May and the flowers are white. The fruit are woody hemispherical capsules crowded together and flattened on one side.

Taxonomy and naming
Cong mallee was first formally described in 1867 by George Bentham from an unpublished description by Robert Brown who gave it the name Eucalyptus dumosa var. conglobata. The description was published in Flora Australiensis. In 1922, Joseph Maiden raised the variety to species status as Eucalyptus conglobata.<ref name=APNI>{{cite web|title=Eucalyptus conglobata|url= https://id.biodiversity.org.au/instance/apni/456018 |publisher=APNI|access-date=6 May 2019}}</ref>

In 1972 Ian Brooker described two subspecies, subsp. conglobata as a synonym of Eucalyptus dumosa var. conglobata, and subsp. fraseri. Eucalyptus conglobata (R.Br. ex Benth.) Maiden subsp. conglobata is accepted by the Australian Plant Census.

In 2004, Brooker and Andrew Slee described Eucalyptus conglobata subsp. perata, a name that has been accepted by the Australian Plant Census.

The specific epithet (conglobata) possibly refers to the clusters of flower buds and fruit. The name perata is from the Latin peratus meaning "western", referring to the distribution of this subspecies compared to subspecies conglobata.

Distribution and habitat
Cong mallee grows in tall shrubland. Subspecies conglobata is the only subspecies occurring in South Australia where it occurs near Port Lincoln, but is also common between Israelite Bay, Esperance and Salmon Gums. Subspecies perata is common west of Esperance, including in the Stirling Ranges, Fitzgerald River National Park and Ravensthorpe. Where the ranges overlap, it is difficult to distinguish between the two subspecies.

Conservation status
Both subspecies of Eucalyptus conglobata'' are classified as "not threatened" by the Western Australian Government Department of Parks and Wildlife.

See also
List of Eucalyptus species

References

conglobata
Endemic flora of Western Australia
Flora of South Australia
Mallees (habit)
Myrtales of Australia
Eucalypts of Western Australia
Plants described in 1867
Taxa named by George Bentham